Sonwad Dam, is an earthfill dam on Sonwad river near Sindkheda, Dhule district in the state of Maharashtra in India.

Specifications

Purpose
 Irrigation

See also
 Dams in Maharashtra
 List of reservoirs and dams in India

References

Dams in Dhule district
Dams completed in 1998
1998 establishments in Maharashtra